St. Andrew's Episcopal Church is an Anglo-catholic church in Denver, Colorado, United States. It is a Gothic style church built c.1907-1909 that was designed by architect Ralph Adams Cram. It was dedicated January 17, 1909 as Trinity Memorial Church and was renamed to St. Andrews in 1917.

The distinguished architect Cram, of Cram and Ferguson in Boston, Massachusetts, was commissioned to design the building for Alexis Dupont Parker as a memorial to his wife.  Parker was a magnate of the Colorado and Southern Railway who was educated in the Episcopal ministry, and was president of the board of the Colorado diocese of the Episcopal Church.

The building was listed on the National Register of Historic Places in 1975.

Expanded in 2008 to a design in keeping with Cram's original plans for a larger church, St. Andrew's now seats 175 in a sanctuary that includes works by Denver artists Marion Buchan and Albert Byron Olson. The parish house is by Denver architect Jacques Benedict.

References

External links
Official website

Churches completed in 1907
20th-century Episcopal church buildings
Churches on the National Register of Historic Places in Colorado
Episcopal church buildings in Colorado
Churches in Denver
Ralph Adams Cram church buildings
National Register of Historic Places in Denver
Anglo-Catholic church buildings in the United States